Budgam, known as Badgom in Kashmiri, is a town in Budgam district in the union territory of Jammu and Kashmir, India. In the 2001 census, it was recorded as having a notified area committee, but by the 2011 census it had a municipal committee.Arath Budgam is the second largest Village of Budgam(Ever Green Public Model School Arath is the popular school in this village).

Demographics
 India census, Budgam had a population of 15,338. There were 9,003 males (59%) and 6,335 females (41%). Of the population, 1,335 (8.7%) were age 0-6: 680 males (51%) and 655 females (49%).  The literacy rate for the people over six was 73.0% (males 84.3%, females 56.4%).

About 25℅ of the Muslim population of Budgam district belong to Shia sect.

Transport

Road 
Budgam is connected with National Highway 444 to rest of India.

Railways 
It is on the Jammu–Baramulla line.

Municipal committee
Keys:

See also
 Ganderbal
 Srinagar
 Dooniwari
 Bagati Kani Pora
 Pulwama
 Ichigam
 Wahabpora

References

External links
 

Cities and towns in Budgam district